The 8th Annual Premios Oye! took place at the Auditorio del Estado in Guanajuato, Guanajuato on November 24, 2009. The nominees were announced on September 29 with Alexander Acha and Banda el Recodo receiving 4 nominations, followed by Fanny Lu, Jenni Rivera, Vicente Fernández and Zoé with 3 each one. It will be celebrated in Guanajuato in order to commemorate the 200th Anniversary of the Mexican Independence Day. Rapahel will be awarded by the Academia Nacional de la Música en México for his 50 years or career. The voting process is certified by PricewaterhouseCoopers.

Arraivals
 Alejandra Espinoza
 Aleks Syntek
 Alexander Acha
 Altair Jarabo
 Ana Bárbara
 Angelique Boyer
 Danna Paola
 Danny Daniel
 Eiza González
 Eleazar Gómez
 Erik Rubin
 Eugenio Siller
 Javier Poza
 Kumbia All Starz
 La Autentica de Jerez
 La Quinta Estación
 Lidia Avila
 Los Super Reyes
 Los Tigres del Norte
 Luis Fonsi
 Luis Lauro
 Lucía Méndez
 Mariana Avila
 María José
Mayra Albor 
 Nadia
 Paty Cantú
 Paulina Rubio
 Sebastián Zurita
 Shaila Dúrcal
 Tush
 Yuridia
 Yuri
 Zoé

Performers
 Los Super Reyes & Kumbia All Starz & Kumbia Kings - Tu Magia / Chica Fatal / No Tengo Dinero
 Danna Paola & Atrévete a Soñar - Welcome / Superstars / Mundo De Caramelo
 Alexander Acha - Te Amo
 María José - Adelante Corazón / No Soy Una Señora
 Tush - Acostumbrado
 Danny Daniel - Vete Ya
 Los Tigres del Norte - La Granja
 Paty Cantú - Déjame Ir
 Luis Fonsi - No Me Doy Por Vencido
 Shaila Dúrcal - La Media Vuelta / Si Nos Dejan
 Ana Bárbara - Rompiendo Cadenas
 Zoé - Nada
 Raphael - Volver, Volver / La Fuerza Del Corazón
 Paulina Rubio - Ni Rosas Ni Juguetes / Causa y Efecto
 Yuri & Yuridia - La Maldita Primavera

Nominees and Winners

General Field

Album of the Year
  20 Años en Vivo — Aleks Syntek
Aleks Syntek, producer.
  Los de Atrás Vienen Conmigo — Calle 13
Elías de León, producer.
  Sin Frenos — La Quinta Estación
Armando Ávila, producer.
  La Revolución — Wisin & Yandel
Juan Luis Morera & Llander Veguilla, producers.
  Reptilectric — Zoé
Phil Vinall & Zoé, producers.

Record of the Year
  "Mañana es para siempre" — J. Eduardo Murguia & Mauricio L. Arriaga, songwriters (Alejandro Fernández)
  "Te Amo" - Alexander Acha, songwriter (Alexander Acha)
  "No Hay Nadie Como Tú" — Eduardo Cabra, Emanuel Del Real Díaz, Enrique Rangel Arroyo, José Alfredo Rangel Arroyo, René Pérez & Rubén Albarrán Ortega, songwriters (Calle 13 featuring Café Tacvba)
  "Tu No Eres Para Mi" - Fanny Lu, Andrés Munera & José Gavira, songwriters (Fanny Lu)
  "No Me Doy Por Vencido" - Luis Fonsi & Claudia Brant, songwriters (Luis Fonsi)

Best New Artist
  Voy — Alexander Acha
  Miedo Escénico — Beto Cuevas
  Me Quedo Sola — Paty Cantú
  Tush — Tush
  Nada Es Normal — Victor & Leo

Pop Field

Best Male Pop
  20 Años En Vivo — Aleks Syntek
  Voy — Alexander Acha
  Vivo — Chayanne
  Palabras Del Silencio — Luis Fonsi
  Que Vueltas Da La Vida — Reyli

Best Female Pop
  Dos — Fanny Lu
  Primavera Anticipada — Laura Pausini
  Amante de lo Ajeno — María José
  Hu Hu Hu — Natalia Lafourcade
  Me Quedo Sola — Paty Cantú

Best Pop by a Duo/Group
  Tour Fantasia Pop — Belanova
  Los de Atrás Vienen Conmigo — Calle 13
  Habitación Doble — Ha*Ash
  Sin Frenos — La Quinta Estación
  La Revolución — Wisin & Yandel

Rock Field

Best Rock by a Duo/Group or Solo
  Mucho + — Babasónicos
  Miedo Escénico — Beto Cuevas
  Barracuda — Kinky
  Queremos Rock — Moderatto
  Reptilectric — Zoé

English Field

Album of the Year
  I Am... Sasha Fierce — Beyoncé
Matthew Knowles & Beyoncé Knowles, producers.
  Circus — Britney Spears
Teresa "LaBarbera" Whites & Larry Rudolph, producers.
  Prospekt's March EP — Coldplay
Markus Dravs, Brian Eno & Rik Simpson, producers.
  The Fame — Lady Gaga
Vincent Herbert, producer.
  No Line on the Horizon — U2
Bryan Eno, Danny Lanois & Steve Lilly White, producers.

Record of the Year
  "Single Ladies" — Beyoncé Knowles, Christopher Stuart, Terius Nash & Thaddis Harrell, songwriters (Beyoncé)
  "Womanizer" - Nikesha Briscoe & Raphael Akinyemi, songwriters (Britney Spears)
  "Life in Technicolor II" — Guy Berryman, Jonny Buckland, Will Champion & Chris Martin, songwriters (Coldplay)
  "Poker Face" - Lady Gaga & RedOne, songwriters (Lady Gaga)
  "Get On Your Boots" - U2, songwriters (U2)

Best New Artist
  Don't Forget — Demi Lovato
  One of the Boys — Katy Perry
  The Fame — Lady Gaga
  We Started Nothing — The Ting Tings
  Hook Me Up — The Veronicas

Popular Field

Album of the Year
  Te Presumo — Banda el Recodo
Fonovisa Records & María de Jesús Lizárraga, producers.
  Mexicano Hasta Las Pampas — Diego Verdaguer
Joan Sebastian, producer.
  Jenni — Jenni Rivera
Jenni Rivera, producer.
  Más Adelante — La Arrolladora Banda El Limón
Fernando Camacho, producer.
  Primera Fila — Vicente Fernández
Gustavo Borner, producer.

Record of the Year
  "Te Presumo" — Husseín Barrera, songwriter (Banda el Recodo)
  "El Mechón" - Abraham Núñez Narváez, songwriter (Banda Sinaloense MS)
  "Culpable ó Inocente" — Camilo Blanes, songwriter (Jenni Rivera)
  "Ya Es Muy Tarde" — Horacio Palencia, songwriter (La Arrolladora Banda El Limón)
  "El Último Beso" — Joan Sebastian, songwriter (Vicente Fernández)

Best New Artist
  Hechizando — Danny Daniel
  Mis Éxitos Con Acordeón Y Tololoche — Espinoza Paz
  Vámonos Pa'l Río — Los Pikadientes de Caborca
  Nueva Ilusión — Majestad de la Sierra
  Rudo y Cursi — Tato "El Cursi" Verduzco (Gael García Bernal)

Best Norteño by a Duo/Group or Solo
  Se Renta Un Corazón — Cardenales De Nuevo León
  Mentir Por Amor — Conjunto Primavera
  Mi Complemento — Los Huracanes del Norte
  Tu Noche con Los Tigres del Norte — Los Tigres del Norte
  Sólo Contigo — Pesado

Best Grupero by a Duo/Group or Solo
  El Mundo No Se Detiene — El Gigante De América
  Cada Vez Más Fuerte — Liberación
  Los Temerarios — Los Temerarios
  Si Tú Te Vas — Los Temerarios
  No Molestar — Marco Antonio Solís

Best Ranchero by a Duo/Group or Solo
  Mexicano Hasta las Pampas — Diego Verdaguer
  Acaríciame — Mayra
  A Puro Dolor — Nadia
  Corazón Ranchero — Shaila Dúrcal
  Primera Fila — Vicente Fernández

Best Banda/Duranguense by a Duo/Group or Solo
  Te Presumo — Banda el Recodo
  Una Poesía — Banda Pequeños Musical
  Jenni — Jenni Rivera
  Como Un Tatauje — K-Paz de la Sierra
  Más Adelante — La Arrolladora Banda El Limón

Best Tropical by a Duo/Group or Solo
  Hechizando — Danny Daniel
  Flor De Mayo — Grupo Cañaveral
  El Vicio De Tu Boca — La Sonora Dinamita
   Luna Desnuda — Los Ángeles de Charly
  Cumbia Con Soul — Cruz Martínez presenta Los Super Reyes

Video of the Year Field

Video in Spanish
  Te Amo — Alexander Acha
Esteban Madrazo, video director; LGA Entertainment, video producer
  Te Presumo — Banda el Recodo
Nene González, video director; LGA Entertainment, video producer
  "Tu No Eres Para Mi" - Fanny Lu
Simón Brand, video director; Mauricio Osorio, video producer
  Causa y Efecto — Paulina Rubio
P. Blond, video director; Art And Music, video producer
  Nada — Zoé
Alejandro Romero "Chicle", video director

Theme from a Telenovela, Movie or T.V. Series

Theme of the year in Spanish
  "Mundo De Caramelo" — Pedro Dabdoub & Carlos Law, songwriters (Danna Paola)
Luis de Llano Macedo, producer (Atrevete a Soñar)
  "En Cambio No" - Laura Pausini & Paolo Carta, songwriters (Laura Pausini)
Carlos Moreno Laguillo, producer (En Nombre del Amor)
  "Juro Que Te Amo" — J. Eduardo Murguía & Mauricio L. Arriaga, songwriters (David Bisbal)
Mapat, producer (Juro Que Te Amo)
  "Mañana Es Para Siempre" - J. Eduardo Murguía & Mauricio L. Arriaga, songwriters (Alejandro Fernández)
Nicandro Díaz González & Mary Carmen Marcos, producers (Mañana es para siempre)
  "Quiero Que Me Quieras" - Rick Nielsen, Mario Lafontaine & Carlos Cuarón, songwriters (Gael García Bernal)
Alejandro González Iñárritu, Guillermo del Toro & Alfonso Cuarón, producers (Rudo y Cursi)
  "Un Gancho Al Corazón" — Alonzo & Ángela Dávalos, songwriters (Playa Limbo)
Angelli Nesma Medina, producer (Un Gancho al Corazón)

Best Song with a Message
  Canción Optimista — Chetes
  Europa VII — La Oreja de Van Gogh
  No me doy por vencido — Luis Fonsi

Audience Award
  — Paulina Rubio

Tribute to the artistic
Raphael

Special Tribute
 Maestro Manuel Esperon

External links
Premios Oye!

References

2009 music awards
Prem
Mexican music awards